State of Siege: Temple Attack is a 2021 Indian Hindi-language action film directed by Ken Ghosh, starring Akshaye Khanna in the lead role. It was made as a direct-to-video film for ZEE5. It is loosely based on the 2002 Akshardham Temple attack and the subsequent operation to kill the perpetrators. It is a standalone sequel to State of Siege: 26/11.

Plot 
 
In 2001, Major Hanut Singh and his team participate in an operation to rescue a minister's daughter, where his best friend is killed during this mission. Due to this, Hanut Singh gets tramutised during his future activities. In the following year, Pakistani terrorists attack and lay siege on a temple in Gujarat. The NSG, led by Hanut Singh, neutralise the terrorists and reclaim the temple.

Cast 

 Akshaye Khanna as Major Hanut Singh, NSG officer
 Gautam Rode as Major Samar, NSG officer
 Vivek Dahiya as Captain Rohit Bagga, NSG officer
 Akshay Oberoi as Captain Bibek (Cameo)
 Abhilash Chaudhary as Iqbal Lead Terrorist
 Parvin Dabas as Colonel Nagar, NSG Commanding Officer
 Samir Soni as Gujarat CM Choksi
 Abhimanyu Singh as Abu Hamza
 Mir Sarwar as Bilal Naikoo
 Manjari Fadnis as Saloni
 Chandan Roy as Mohsin

Production 
The film is a next installment to State of Siege: 26/11, a web series about the 2008 Mumbai attacks. The film is loosely based on the terrorist attack at Akshardham Temple in 2002 Akshardham Temple attack in Gandhinagar.

Reception 

Archika Khurana of Times of India gave the film 3.5 out of 5 stars and stated, "After 'State of Siege: 26/11', this 112-minutes combat drama is a fitting tribute to our NSG soldiers. This dramatized retelling may bring up unpleasant memories for some, but it is well worth watching." Arushi Jain of The Indian Express gave the film a mostly positive review and stated, "Led by Akshaye Khanna, this film is for everyone who likes to see a cat-and-mouse chase between ghastly, heavily armed men and brave, 'can do anything for the nation' soldiers." Saibal Chatterjee of NDTV gave the film 2 out of 5 stars and stated, "Akshaye Khanna is doubtless a talented actor. One sees flashes of his class all through the film. But he is trapped in a script that has little room for vivid character development." Soumya Srivastava of The Hindustan Times gave the film a mixed review and stated, "The 2002 attack was a gruesome blot on the history of our country. 30 lives were lost. No Bollywood masala film should be allowed to say it was too little, too bland."

Anna MM Vetticad of Firstpost gave the film 1.75 out of 5 stars and stated, "State of Siege: Temple Attack does everything in its power to indicate that it is based on the 2002 Akshardham Temple attack. It then twists itself in knots to distance itself from that real-life story." Prateek Sur of Rediff.com gave the film 2 out of 5 stars and stated, "Akshaye Khanna is the only worthy element about this patriotic actioner." Nandini Ramnath of Scroll gave the film a positive review and stated, "Temple Attack is Khanna’s first foray into the digital space. True to form, the maverick actor has chosen a launchpad in which he is one among many but still able to stand out because of sheer star power." Roktim Rajpal of Deccan Herald gave the film 2.5 out of 5 stars and praised the action sequences and Khanna's performance, though criticized the "middling execution" and "half-baked characters".

References

External links 
 State of Siege: Temple Attack at ZEE5
 

2020s Hindi-language films
Indian direct-to-video films
2021 direct-to-video films
2021 films
ZEE5 original programming
Films about terrorism in India